Jan Schindeler (18 December 1892 – 7 December 1963) was a Dutch footballer. He played in one match for the Netherlands national football team in 1925.

References

External links
 

1892 births
1963 deaths
Dutch footballers
Netherlands international footballers
Place of birth missing
Association footballers not categorized by position